The Bedford Block is an historic commercial building at 99 Bedford Street Boston, Massachusetts in an area called Church Green. Built in 1875 in a style promoted by John Ruskin called Venetian Gothic. The style may also be referred to as Ruskinian Gothic.

It was designed by Charles Amos Cummings and Willard T. Sears for Henry and Francis Lee  as a retail shoe center in an area that had been destroyed by the Great Boston Fire of 1872. The building was added to the National Historic Register in 1979. Building was renovated in 1983 in conjunction with the Bay-Bedford Company.

The Bedford Block's exterior is constructed of polychromatic bands of New Brunswick red granite, Tuckahoen marble, and pressed terra-cotta panels manufactured in Philadelphia, Pennsylvania.  It was the first building after the Great Fire to use New Brunswick red granite as a material.

The first floor features rough rustic blocks. Upper floor details include arched bay windows, Viollet-le-Duc inspired iron balconets and flat column pilasters. Each roof gable is topped with a finial crown. There is a glazed tile clock is located in a 5-story tower at the corner of Bedford and Summer streets.

See also
National Register of Historic Places listings in northern Boston, Massachusetts

Footnotes

References

Morgan, Keith N., editor, Richard M. Candee, Naomi Miller, et al. Buildings of Massachusetts: Metropolitan Boston. University of Virginia Press: 2009. .
Placzek, Adolf K. Macmillan. Encyclopedia of Architects. 4 vols. Free Press: 1982. .
Shand-Tucci, Douglas. Built in Boston: City and Suburb, 1800–2000. The University of Massachusetts Press: 1999. .
Withey, Henry F. Biographical Dictionary of American Architects (Deceased). Hennessey & Ingalls: 1970.

Commercial blocks on the National Register of Historic Places in Massachusetts
Cummings and Sears buildings
Buildings and structures in Boston
Commercial buildings completed in 1875
Neoclassical architecture in Massachusetts
Gothic Revival architecture in Massachusetts
Victorian architecture in Massachusetts
Venetian Gothic architecture in the United States
National Register of Historic Places in Boston